Griers Presbyterian Church and Cemetery  is a historic Presbyterian church and cemetery located near Frogsboro, Caswell County, North Carolina.  It was built about 1856, and is a simple, rectangular frame building.  It is an example of Greek Revival temple-form church architecture.  Also on the property is a contributing church cemetery.

It was listed on the National Register of Historic Places in 1985.

References

External links
 
 

Presbyterian churches in North Carolina
Cemeteries on the National Register of Historic Places in North Carolina
Churches on the National Register of Historic Places in North Carolina
Greek Revival church buildings in North Carolina
Churches completed in 1856
19th-century Presbyterian church buildings in the United States
Churches in Caswell County, North Carolina
National Register of Historic Places in Caswell County, North Carolina
Wooden churches in North Carolina